DZB may refer to:

 German Central Library for the Blind (Deutsche Zentralbücherei für Blinde) in Leipzig, Germany
 XerxesDZB, a Dutch football club in Rotterdam, Netherlands